François Joseph Westermann (5 September 17515 April 1794) was a French general of the Revolutionary Wars and political figure of the French Revolution.



Career
Born in Molsheim (Alsace, today department Bas-Rhin), François Joseph Westermann entered a cavalry regiment at an early age but soon left the service and went to Paris. He was an enthusiastic supporter of the Revolution, and in 1790 became greffier of the municipality of Haguenau. After a short imprisonment on a charge of inciting riots in Haguenau, he returned to Paris, where he joined Georges Danton and played an important part in the attack on the Tuileries on 10 August 1792.

He accompanied Charles François Dumouriez on his campaigns with the Army of the North, and assisted him in his negotiations with the Habsburgs, being arrested as an accomplice after the general's defection. Denounced by Jean-Paul Marat to the National Convention, Westermann succeeded in proving his innocence, and was sent with the rank of general of brigade to quell the Revolt in the Vendée.

Vendée and downfall
Westermann distinguished himself by his extraordinary courage, daring maneuvers, and  severe treatment of the insurgents. After suffering a defeat at Châtillon, he defeated the Vendéens at Beaupréau, Laval, Granville, and Baugé, and in December 1793 annihilated their army at Le Mans and Savenay.

In a controversial document, the authenticity of which is disputed, Westermann supposedly wrote to the Committee of Public Safety:
"There is no more Vendée, Republican citizens. It died beneath our free sword, with its women and its children. I have just buried it in the swamps and the woods of Savenay. Following the orders that you gave to me, I crushed the children beneath the horses' hooves, massacred the women who, those at least, will bear no more brigands. I do not have a single prisoner to reproach myself with. I have exterminated them all..."

Some historians believe this letter never existed. The rebellion was still going on, and there were several thousand living Vendéan prisoners being held by Westermann's forces when the letter was supposedly written. The killing of civilians would also have been an explicit violation of the Convention's orders to Westermann.

After his victory he was summoned to Paris, where, as a friend and partisan of Georges Danton, he was proscribed with the Dantonist party and guillotined.

He is depicted by Jacques Villeret in the 1983 film Danton and by Eduard von Winterstein in the 1921 movie of the same name.

References

1751 births
1794 deaths
French generals
People from Bas-Rhin
French Republican military leaders of the French Revolutionary Wars
French people executed by guillotine during the French Revolution
Republican military leaders of the War in the Vendée